Yeh Rastey Hain Pyar Ke is a 1963 Hindi film starring Sunil Dutt and Leela Naidu in the lead roles. This film was Sunil Dutt's debut production, directed by R.K. Nayyar, with music composed by Ravi.

Plot 
Anil Sahni (Sunil Dutt) is a pilot who married Neena (Leela Naidu) against his father's wishes. When Anil was away on a trip, Neena and Ashok (Rehman) come close and have an affair. Anil returns and is furious to find out about the affair. He confronts Ashok, who is killed in an ensuing scuffle. Anil is tried for murder in court, with defence and prosecution lawyers fighting it out.

Cast 
 Ashok Kumar as Advocate Byomkesh Mukherjee
 Sunil Dutt as Anil Sahni
 Leela Naidu as Neena Sahni
 Motilal as Prosecutor Ali Khan
 Rehman as Ashok Shrivastav
 Shashikala as Asha
 Rajendra Nath as Kewal Kapoor
 Hari Shivdasani as Rai Bahadur Gyanchand Sahni
 Iftekhar as Junior Lawyer

Soundtrack
Ravi has composed the music of the film and lyrics were penned by Rajinder Krishan.

References

External links
 

1963 films
1960s Hindi-language films
Films scored by Ravi